The School for Scandal is a play by Richard Brinsley Sheridan first performed in 1777.

The School for Scandal may also refer to:

The School for Scandal, a 1914 film adaptation directed by Kenean Buel
The School for Scandal (1923 film), a silent film adaptation of the play
The School for Scandal (1930 film), the first sound film adaptation of the play; a lost film
The School van Scandal (1963 Broadway production), featuring John Gielgud and Ralph Richardson
The School for Scandal (Barber), a 1931 overture by Samuel Barber
"School for Scandal" (Murder, She Wrote), a 1985 television episode

See also
 School for Scoundrels